The Gjøvik Line is a Norwegian railway line between Oslo and Gjøvik. It was originally named the North Line (Nordbanen) and ran between Grefsen and Røykenvik. The line was completed to Gjøvik in 1902. The Gjøvik Line was one of the first lines of the Norwegian railway system which was to be contracted on public service obligation, but it was the state owned Norges Statsbaner which won, operating it through its subsidiary Vy Gjøvikbanen.

The line
The lines is the smallest and least trafficked railway line from Oslo, and the only single track line in the capital.

It serves some of the northern neighborhoods of Oslo, and has a few stations in the woods of Nordmarka. Further north the line serves the municipality of Nittedal. At Roa, the Roa–Hønefoss Line branches off to Hønefoss, where it continues as the Bergen Line. Formerly, most trains between Oslo and Bergen used this route, but nowadays most passenger trains run on the route through Drammen, which is slightly longer but which runs through more densely populated areas. Freight trains use the line over Roa, and sometimes passenger trains also use this line as a reserve line if the route from Hønefoss to Oslo via Drammen is temporarily closed. Further north, the Gjøvik Line runs through the district of Toten before ending at Gjøvik.

The Gjøvik Line formerly had three branch lines, the Røykenvik Line, the Valdres Line and the Skreia Line. All these lines are now closed.

Most of the service on the Gjøvik Line is provided by electric multiple units. The passenger routes are served by the newly (2006) redesigned Type 69D multiple units named Type 69G, rebuilt in Denmark by Danske Statsbaner (DSB).

External links
The Norwegian National Rail Administration's list of stations on the Gjøvik Line

 
Railway lines in Innlandet
Railway lines in Oslo
Railway lines in Viken
Railway lines opened in 1902
Electric railways in Norway
1902 establishments in Norway